was a Japanese politician. He was Governor of Okinawa Prefecture from 1976 until 1978.

1909 births
1982 deaths
People from Okinawa Prefecture
Governors of Okinawa Prefecture